Walter Angelo Fox-Strangways, 8th Earl of Ilchester  24 September 1887 – 4 October 1970), was a British peer. He also held the subsidiary titles of Baron Ilchester, Baron Strangways and Baron Ilchester and Stavordale.  
Fox-Strangways inherited the earldom of Ilchester from Edward Henry Charles James Fox-Strangways, 7th Earl of Ilchester, his fifth cousin once removed, after the 7th Earl died without surviving male issue.

Biography
He was the son of Maurice Walter Fox-Strangways CSI (1862–; d. 27 May 1938) and his wife Louisa Blanche Phillips, daughter of Major-General George Phillips. He was educated at Charterhouse School and Pembroke College, Cambridge. He succeeded to the earldom in 1964.

Marriage and family
On 8 April 1916, Fox-Strangways married Laure Georgine Emilie Mazaraki, daughter of Evanghelos Georgios Mazaraki, an executive with the Suez Canal Company; they had three children:
Group Capt. Maurice Vivian de Touffreville Fox-Strangways (1 April 1920 - 2 July 2006)
Raymond George Fox-Strangways (11 November 1921 - 27 April 2005)
Lady Elizabeth Doreen Jeanne Fox-Strangways (21 January 1931 - 18 September 2008)

The 8th Earl died on 4 October 1970 aged 83 and was succeeded in the earldom by his elder son Maurice.

Arms

The arms of the head of the Fox-Strangways family are blazoned Quarterly of four: 1st & 4th: Sable, two lions passant paly of six argent and gules (Strangways); 2nd & 3rd: Ermine, on a chevron azure three foxes' heads and necks erased or on a canton of the second a fleur-de-lys of the third (Fox).

References

1887 births
1970 deaths
Earls of Ilchester
People educated at Charterhouse School
Alumni of Pembroke College, Cambridge
English philanthropists
Walter
Deputy Lieutenants of Dorset
20th-century British philanthropists